Jamiah Islamiah Talimuddin Dabhel (or Dabhel Jamiah Islamiah or Jamiah Islamiah Dabhel) is a Deobandi Islamic seminary in Dabhel, Gujarat, India.

Education pattern
The Jamiah has the following departments: 
 Nazirah-e-Qur'an (reading the Qur'an)
 Tahfeez-ul-Qur'an (memorizing the Qur'an)
 Department of Tajweed (Quranic phonetics)
 Department of Islamic Law (Mufti)
 Department of Islamic Jurisprudence (Fiqh)
 Department of Hadith
 Department of Tafsir
 Department of Arabic language
 Department of Persian language
 Department of Deviant Sects

Notable alumni
 Allamah Muhammad Yousuf Banuri
 Azizul Haque
 Maulana Muhammad saeed Buzurg Simlaki Former Mohtamim Of Jamiah
 Syed Azhar Shah Qaiser
 Maulana Abdul Hai Ismail bismillah Former teacher And Mohtamim of Jamia
 Mufti Ebrahim Desai
 Maulana Ghulam Ullah Khan

See also
Darul Uloom Deoband
Darul Uloom Karachi
Darul Uloom London

References

External links 
 Shaykhul Hadith Maulana Fazlurahman

Islam in India
Deobandi Islamic universities and colleges
Islamic universities and colleges in India
Educational institutions established in 1928
1928 establishments in India
Jamia Islamia Talimuddin